Leason Ellis is an intellectual property law firm based in White Plains, NY.  It is the largest intellectual property law firm in Westchester County, NY.

Practice Areas

Leason Ellis specializes in the following practice areas:

 Patents
 Trademarks
 Copyrights
 Litigation
 Licensing

Technologies
Leason Ellis advises clients across a broad range of fields and industries including:
 Computer Hardware and Software
 Medical Devices
 Chemicals and Materials
 Mechanical and Industrial Equipment
 Pharma/Biotech
 Consumer Electronics

Affiliations
 Member, Advisory Council of NY Biohud Valley, an organization dedicated to furthering the growth and development of Biotech/Pharmaceutical companies in the Hudson Valley

In the News
 Leason Ellis was recognized for prevailing in a lawsuit against USA Trademark Enterprises, Inc., an entity that sent official-looking notices to trademark filers with requests for payment.  The firm obtained a judgement against USA Trademark Enterprises, as well as a payment of $10,000 which the firm donated to the USPTO to support efforts to educate trademark filers as to how to identify such scams.
 Attorneys from Leason Ellis have been called upon by media outlets such as the New York Times, CNBC, CNN, NPR and Reuters to comment on intellectual property issues surrounding the 2012 Olympics, intellectual property protection in China, and various intellectual property disputes.

References

Intellectual property law firms
Law firms based in New York (state)